James Connachan (29 August 1874 – ?) was a Scottish footballer. His regular position was as a forward. He was born in Glasgow. He played for Glasgow Perthshire, Duntocher Hibernian, Celtic, Airdrieonians, Glossop North End, and Manchester United.

External links
MUFCInfo.com profile

1874 births
Scottish footballers
Celtic F.C. players
Airdrieonians F.C. (1878) players
Glossop North End A.F.C. players
Manchester United F.C. players
Year of death missing
Glasgow Perthshire F.C. players
Duntocher Hibernian F.C. players
Association football forwards